Ultimate Card Games is a game created by German studio Cosmigo and published by Telegames for the Game Boy Advance and Nintendo DS platforms. It contains several thinking games, such as Poker and Solitaire. Ultimate Card Games for the Nintendo DS was initially scheduled for release in spring of 2005. After numerous delays, an October 2007 press release from Nintendo placed the game's release in March 2008, but the game was not shipped to retailers. Ultimate Card Games DS was in development and testing until November 8, 2011.

Games
It includes the following card games:
Hearts
Spades
Bridge
Euchre
Cribbage
Canasta
Gin Rummy
Go Fish
Crazy Eights
Five Card Stud Poker
Blackjack

See also
Ultimate Brain Games

References

External links
Telegames, Inc.
Cosmigo GmbH

2004 video games
Digital card games
Game Boy Advance games
Multiplayer and single-player video games
Nintendo DS games
Telegames games
Video games developed in Germany
Cosmigo games